Girltrash: All Night Long is a 2014 musical comedy film directed by Alexandra Kondracke and written by Angela Robinson. The film is a prequel to the web series Girltrash! and stars Lisa Rieffel, Michelle Lombardo, Gabrielle Christian and Mandy Musgrave.

Plot Synopsis 
Set during one long night in the LGBT sub-culture of Los Angeles, Daisy and Tyler are two rock and roll musicians who are selected to partake in a battle of the bands contest to claim a prize. But while on their way to the concert, their van breaks down and they are sidetracked by Daisy's younger sister, Colby, a recent college graduate who agrees to drive them to the concert if they help her hook up with her crush; a struggling actress named Misty. Also tagging along is Misty's bisexual best friend Sid, who longs to hook up with a famous celebrity. However, Misty is not interested in hooking up with Colby because she has her sights on Tyler. Meanwhile, Daisy tries to win back her ex-girlfriend, Xan, who is on a date with her latest girlfriend who is competing against Daisy and Tyler's band that very night. Elsewhere, Monique Jones is a violent ex-con recently paroled from prison who comes looking for Daisy and Tyler with a score to settle.

Cast
 Lisa Rieffel as Daisy Robson
 Michelle Lombardo as Tyler Murphy
 Gabrielle Christian as Colby Robson
 Mandy Musgrave as Misty Monroe
 Kate French as Sid
 Clementine Ford as Zan
 Rose Rollins as Monique Shaniqua Jones
 Heather Thomas as Nadine Robson
 Megan Cavanagh as Officer Margie

Awards

See also 

 List of LGBT-related films directed by women

References

External links
 

2014 films
2014 LGBT-related films
American LGBT-related films
LGBT-related musical comedy films
American rock musicals
Lesbian-related films
Films set in Los Angeles
Films about fraternities and sororities
2010s musical comedy films
2014 comedy films
2010s English-language films
2010s American films